The Lobatse Mosque is a mosque in Lobatse, South-East District, Botswana.

History
The mosque was built by the Botswana Muslim Association and completed in 1967, making it the oldest in the country.

See also
 Islam in Botswana

References

1967 establishments in Botswana
Islam in Botswana
Mosques completed in 1967
Mosques in Africa
Religious buildings and structures in Botswana
South-East District (Botswana)